Patricia Diana Joy Anne Cacek (December 22, 1951, Hollywood, California) is an American author, mostly of horror novels. She graduated with a B.A in creative writing from California State University, Long Beach in 1975.

Awards
 1996 – "Metalica" – International Horror Guild Award, Best Short Story (Nomination)
 1996 – "Metalica" – Bram Stoker Award, Superior Achievement in Short Fiction (Win)
 1997 – "Dust Motes" – International Horror Guild Award, Best Short Story (Nomination)
 1998 – Night Prayers – Bram Stoker Award, Superior Achievement in a First Novel (Nomination)
 1998 – "Leavings" – Bram Stoker Award, Superior Achievement in Long Fiction (Nomination)
 1998 – Leavings – Bram Stoker Award, Superior Achievement in a Fiction Collection (Nomination)
 1998 – "Dust Motes" – World Fantasy Award, Best Short Fiction (Win)
 1999 – "The Grave" – Bram Stoker Award, Superior Achievement in Short Fiction (Nomination)

Bibliography

Novels
 Night Prayers (1998)
 Canyons (2000)
 Night Players (2001)
 The Wind Caller (2004)

Collections
 Leavings (1997)
 * Eros Interruptus (2005, Diplodocus Press)

Anthologies
 Bell, Book & Beyond (1999)

References

External links
 
 Author's web page

See also
List of horror fiction authors

American science fiction writers
1951 births
Living people
American horror novelists
20th-century American novelists
American women novelists
California State University, Long Beach alumni
21st-century American novelists
Women science fiction and fantasy writers
Women horror writers
World Fantasy Award-winning writers
20th-century American women writers
21st-century American women writers